Metropolitan Music Co. was a Minneapolis-based music publishing and string instrument retailer founded in the late 1879 as part of W. J. Dyer & Bro. of Saint Paul, Minnesota.  It was originally at 41–43 South Sixth Street.  On September 4, 1897, W. J. Dyer & Bro. merged into Metropolitan Music Co.  Heinrich Bauer was the proprietor in the late 1890s.  B. A. Rose, who had started as an employee in the sheet music department, became the proprietor.  The firm served the middle and northwest sections of the United States.

Selected published works 
 "Carnival march" (for piano), by R.A.F. (1897) 
 "We never had a better time at Grady's," lyrics & music by Harry S. Miller (1897) 
 "Metropolitan coon songs: two step," lyrics & music by Heinrich Bauer (1897) 
 "The little chicken thief," lyrics & music by Harry Von Tilzer (1897) 
 "The winner: two step or cake walk for piano," lyrics & music by Edmund Braham (1898) 
 "Frank David's cake walk and two step," lyrics & music by Frank David (1899) 
 "Waiting a soldier's return," lyrics & music by Myra Wiren (1899) 
 "Starlight reverie," lyrics & music by John A. Seidt (1901) 
 "When song is sweet," lyrics & music by Gertrude Sans-Souci (1902) 
 "San Francisco," lyrics & music by Mary I. Gellatly (1906) 
 "Demand the union label," lyrics & music by Silas L. Berry (1906) 
 "Red Fox Trot," lyrics & music by Ted S. Barron (1914)   
 "When I Hesitate With You," lyrics & music by Stanley Epstein (1914)  
 "My Country Belle," lyrics by Edward Hediger, music by Metropolitan Music Co. (1907)
 "March in G minor," lyrics & music by Stanley R. Avery (1916) 
 "After the war is over, where will the Kaiser go?" lyrics & music by Fred C. Stoutenburg (1918) 
 "Second Field Artillery Brigade," lyrics & music by Carl Dillon (1924) 
 "The brogue my mother spoke," lyrics & music by Al Hay (1925)

Personnel 
 William John Dyer (1841–1925)
 Charles E. Dyer Sr. (born 1845–1897), William John Dyer's brother
 Heinrich Bauer, Proprietor (late 1890s) 
 Bert Aaron Rose (1866–1940), Proprietor
 Edward Rowland Dyer (1867–1941), William John Dyer's son and President from before 1908 and until after 1924

References 

Sheet music publishing companies
Music publishing companies of the United States
History of Minneapolis